Kashif is a village in western Syria, administratively part of the Homs Governorate.

References

Villages in Syria